Kleos (Greek: κλέος) is the Greek word often translated to "renown", or "glory". It is related to the English word "loud" and carries the implied meaning of "what others hear about you". A Greek hero earns kleos through accomplishing great deeds.

According to Gregory Nagy, besides the meaning of "glory", kleos can also be used as the medium (in this case, the ancient Greek poetry or song) which conveys glory.

Kleos is invariably transferred from father to son; the son is responsible for carrying on and building upon the "glory" of the father. This is a reason for Penelope putting off her suitors for so long, and one justification for Medea's murder of her own children was to cut short Jason's kleos.

Kleos is a common theme in Homer's epics, the Iliad and the Odyssey, the main example in the latter being that of Odysseus and his son Telemachus, who is concerned that his father may have died a pathetic and pitiable death at sea rather than a reputable and gracious one in battle.  The Iliad is about gaining ultimate kleos on the battlefields of Troy while the Odyssey is the ten-year quest of Odysseus' nostos (or return journey). Telemachus fears that he has been deprived of kleos.  This links to hereditary kleos.

Etymology

According to Gregory Nagy, kleos is a noun, derived from the verb kluein, which means 'hear'.

From other source, the Greek term kleos is derived from the Proto-Indo-European (PIE) term *ḱlewos, which expressed a similar concept in PIE society. As the PIE people had no concept of the continuation of the individual after life, one could only hope to achieve *ḱlewos *ndhgwhitom, or "the fame that does not decay." As Bruce Lincoln notes, "In a universe where impersonal matter endured forever but the personal self was extinguished at death, the most which could survive of that self was a rumor, a reputation. For this, the person craving immortality—a condition proper only to the gods and antithetical to human existence—was totally reliant on poets and poetry."

Cognates include Sanskrit, श्रवस् (śravas); Avestan, 𐬯𐬭𐬀𐬬𐬀𐬵; Armenian, լու (low); Old Church Slavonic slava, and Old Irish, clú.  Compare to the Greek: κλύω (kluō - I hear'').

Plato
The Greek philosopher Plato, in his dialogue The Symposium relating a discussion about love, makes a digression into the subject of fame and glory. It is in the section that deals with the dialog between Socrates and Diotima. Diotima explains that men search for ways to reach some kind of immortality, for instance by means of physical and intellectual procreation. Diotima then asserts that the love for fame and glory is very strong, and in fact to obtain them, men are ready to engage in the greatest effort, and to take risks and make sacrifices, even at the cost of their lives. Diotima makes specific references to Alcestis (who died to save Admetus), Achilles (to avenge Patroclus), and Codrus, as examples of heroes in search of fame and immortal renown.

See also
 Gestaþáttr

References

Further reading
 Barbantani, Silvia. "Models of Virtue, Models of Poetry: The Quest for “Everlasting Fame” in Hellenistic Military Epitaphs." In Celebrity, Fame, and Infamy in the Hellenistic World, edited by FABER RIEMER A., 37-69. Toronto; Buffalo; London: University of Toronto Press, 2020. Accessed May 19, 2020. .
 Finkelberg, Margalit. "More on "Kleos Aphtiton"." The Classical Quarterly 57, no. 2 (2007): 341-50. .
 Floyd, Edwin D. "Kleos Aphthiton: An Indo-European Perspective on Early Greek Poetry." Glotta 58, no. 3/4 (1980): 133–57. .
 Meltzer, Gary S. ""Where Is the Glory of Troy?" "Kleos" in Euripides' "Helen"." Classical Antiquity 13, no. 2 (1994): 234-55. .
 Segal, Charles. "KLEOS AND ITS IRONIES IN THE ODYSSEY." L'Antiquité Classique 52 (1983): 22–47. .
 Segal, Charles. "Kleos and Its Ironies." In Singers, Heroes, and Gods in the "Odyssey", 85–110. ITHACA; LONDON: Cornell University Press, 1994. .

Ancient Greece
Ancient Greek culture
Greek language
Proto-Indo-European language
Indo-European culture